Carlos Oliveira Hernández (date of birth and death unknown) was a Cuban footballer.

He represented Cuba at the 1938 FIFA World Cup in France.

References

External links
 

Year of birth missing
Year of death missing
Association football forwards
Cuban footballers
Cuba international footballers
1938 FIFA World Cup players